South Bend station is a train station in South Bend, Indiana, serving Amtrak.

South Bend station may also refer to:

South Bend station (South Shore Line), a former South Shore Line station
South Bend Airport station, a current South Shore Line station
Union Station (South Bend, Indiana), built in 1929 for the New York Central and Grand Trunk Western Railroads, closed in 1971
South Bend (PRR station) built so the Pennsylvania Railroad could have access to South Bend

See also
South Bend (disambiguation)